Ostorhinchus sealei, Seale's cardinalfish or the cheek-barred cardinalfish, is a species of ray-finned fish, a cardinalfish, from the family Apogonidae. It is an Indo-Pacific species which ranges from Malaysia east to the Solomon Islands, north to southern Japan and south to northwestern Australia, as well as Palau in Micronesia. It is an uncommon species which occurs among branching corals in the sheltered lagoons protected by reefs. It can be found in small to large aggregations low in the water over the reef. They are mouthbrooders which form pairs to mate. During the day these fish shelter in the reef and they emerge at night to feed on zooplankton and benthic invertebrates. The specific name honours the American ichthyologist Alvin Seale (1871-1958).

References

External links
 

sealei
Fish described in 1918